The Chevrolet Beauville was originally a station wagon option for the 1954 Chevrolet Bel Air.  The name was later resurrected as a full-size van option for the Chevrolet Van in 1970. Both were related to the lower trim level Chevrolet Townsman.

1954
In 1954 Chevrolet introduced the 4-door Beauville Wagon as an option for the Bel Air Line. It came standard with a 6-cylinder engine and featured woodgrain trim around the side windows.

1956
In 1956 the Beauville became a wagon option for the Chevrolet 210 as well.

Engines
Chevrolet Station wagons offered a wide variety of engines rated from the  6-cylinder to the  V8. 

One base engine Chevrolet offered in 1956 was a  6-cylinder engine with a cast-iron block and a compression ratio of 8.0:1. It was carbureted, with a Rochester single barrel carburetor and produced  power at 4200 revolutions per minute.

In 1956 two other  V8s were offered but both had a 9.25:1 compression ratio, 4-barrel carburetors, and a dual exhaust. The Turbo-Fire 225 engine was equipped with 2 Carter 4-barrel carburetors and produced  at 5200 rpm while the Turbo-Fire 205 engine had a single 4-barrel carburetor with a peak  at 4600 rpm.

1957
In 1957 the Beauville station wagon was not offered in the Bel Air line, only in the 210. 
 
The super turbo-fire 283 was a fuel-injected engine that was a $550 option back in 1957.

References

Beauville
Motor vehicles manufactured in the United States
Rear-wheel-drive vehicles